The Plain Blue Banner was one of the Eight Banners of Manchu military and society during the Later Jin and Qing dynasty of China.

Members
 Li Yongfang
 Abatai
 Agui
 Zhao Erfeng (Han)
 Keying (official)
 Imperial Noble Consort Gongsu

Notable Clans
 Arute Hala
 Janggiya
 Giorca
 Yehe Nara
 Zhao
 Liugiya
 Li

 
Eight Banners